Anarsia dejoannisi is a moth of the family Gelechiidae. It is found in France.

References

Moths described in 1994
dejoannisi
Moths of Europe